This is a list of the members of the 11th Seanad Éireann, the upper house of the Oireachtas (legislature) of Ireland. These Senators were elected or appointed in 1965, after the 1965 general election and served until the close of poll for the 12th Seanad in 1969.

Composition of the 11th Seanad
There are a total of 60 seats in the Seanad. 43 Senators are elected by the Vocational panels, 6 elected by the Universities and 11 are nominated by the Taoiseach.

The following table shows the composition by party when the 11th Seanad first met on 23 June 1965.

List of senators

Changes

See also
Members of the 18th Dáil
Government of the 18th Dáil

References

External links

 
11